Mary Chesnut's Civil War is an annotated collection of the diaries of Mary Boykin Chesnut, an upper-class planter who lived in South Carolina during the American Civil War. The diaries were extensively annotated by historian C. Vann Woodward and published by Yale University Press in 1981. For his work on the book, Woodward was awarded the 1982 Pulitzer Prize for History.

References 

1981 non-fiction books
American non-fiction books
History books about the American Civil War
Diaries
Yale University Press books
Pulitzer Prize for History-winning works
Works about women in war